This is a list of players promoted from Academies to the Senior squads of  Aviva Premiership teams leading up to the 2014–15 season.

Bath
 Will Spencer

Gloucester

 Elliott Stooke 
 Billy Burns 
 Ross Moriarty

Harlequins
 Jack Clifford
 George Merrick
 Sam Stuart
 Harry Sloan
 Sam Twomey

London Wasps
 Will Rowlands

Northampton Saints

 Alex Day'
 Tom Stephenson

See also
List of 2014–15 Premiership Rugby transfers
List of 2014-15 RFU Championship transfers
List of 2014–15 Pro12 transfers
List of 2014–15 Top 14 transfers

References

Academy
British rugby union lists